Lakouablia (Arabic:الكوابلية) is a village belonging to Sidi Chiker and to the Youssoufia Province within the  area of Marrakesh-Safi of Morocco

History
The Lakouablia is known for agricultural activities since the French colonization of Morocco and is considered the feet of the inhabitants of the region and away from the Royal Conservatory of Msabih Talaa about one and a half kilometers away from Marrakesh and about 71 kilometres.

Football
Lakouablia's national club is Mouloudia Club Lakouablia and is currently playing in the regional league since 2011 and did not join the section and has a large audience that occupies the first place in the public.

Populated places in Youssoufia Province